The 1973 Pacific Tigers football team represented the University of the Pacific (UOP) in the 1973 NCAA Division I football season as a member of the Pacific Coast Athletic Association.

The team was led by head coach Chester Caddas, in his second year, and played their home games at Pacific Memorial Stadium in Stockton, California. They finished the season with a record of seven wins, two losses and one tie (7–2–1, 2–1–1 PCAA). The Tigers outscored their opponents 279–109 for the entire season.

Schedule

Team players in the NFL
The following UOP players were selected in the 1974 NFL Draft.

Notes

References

Pacific
Pacific Tigers football seasons
Pacific Tigers football